SQLAlchemy is an open-source SQL toolkit and object-relational mapper (ORM) for the Python programming language released under the MIT License.

Description
SQLAlchemy's philosophy is that relational databases behave less like object collections as the scale gets larger and performance starts being a concern, while object collections behave less like tables and rows as more abstraction is designed into them. For this reason it has adopted the data mapper pattern (similar to Hibernate for Java) rather than the active record pattern used by a number of other object-relational mappers.

History
SQLAlchemy was first released in February 2006

Example

The following example represents an n-to-1 relationship between movies and their directors. It is shown how user-defined Python classes create corresponding database tables, how instances with relationships are created from either side of the relationship, and finally how the data can be queried—illustrating automatically generated SQL queries for both lazy and eager loading.

Schema definition
Creating two Python classes and corresponding database tables in the DBMS:

from sqlalchemy import *
from sqlalchemy.ext.declarative import declarative_base
from sqlalchemy.orm import relation, sessionmaker

Base = declarative_base()

class Movie(Base):
    __tablename__ = "movies"

    id = Column(Integer, primary_key=True)
    title = Column(String(255), nullable=False)
    year = Column(Integer)
    directed_by = Column(Integer, ForeignKey("directors.id"))

    director = relation("Director", backref="movies", lazy=False)

    def __init__(self, title=None, year=None):
        self.title = title
        self.year = year

    def __repr__(self):
        return "Movie(%r, %r, %r)" % (self.title, self.year, self.director)

class Director(Base):
    __tablename__ = "directors"

    id = Column(Integer, primary_key=True)
    name = Column(String(50), nullable=False, unique=True)

    def __init__(self, name=None):
        self.name = name

    def __repr__(self):
        return "Director(%r)" % (self.name)

engine = create_engine("dbms://user:pwd@host/dbname")
Base.metadata.create_all(engine)

Data insertion
One can insert a director-movie relationship via either entity:
Session = sessionmaker(bind=engine)
session = Session()

m1 = Movie("Robocop", 1987)
m1.director = Director("Paul Verhoeven")

d2 = Director("George Lucas")
d2.movies = [Movie("Star Wars", 1977), Movie("THX 1138", 1971)]

try:
    session.add(m1)
    session.add(d2)
    session.commit()
except:
    session.rollback()

Querying
alldata = session.query(Movie).all()
for somedata in alldata:
    print(somedata)

SQLAlchemy issues the following query to the DBMS (omitting aliases):
SELECT movies.id, movies.title, movies.year, movies.directed_by, directors.id, directors.name
FROM movies LEFT OUTER JOIN directors ON directors.id = movies.directed_by

The output:
Movie('Robocop', 1987L, Director('Paul Verhoeven'))
Movie('Star Wars', 1977L, Director('George Lucas'))
Movie('THX 1138', 1971L, Director('George Lucas'))

Setting lazy=True (default) instead, SQLAlchemy would first issue a query to get the list of movies and only when needed (lazy) for each director a query to get the name of the corresponding director:
SELECT movies.id, movies.title, movies.year, movies.directed_by
FROM movies

SELECT directors.id, directors.name
FROM directors
WHERE directors.id = %s

See also

 SQLObject
 Storm
 Pylons
 TurboGears
 Cubes (OLAP server)

References

Notes
 
 Rick Copeland, Essential SQLAlchemy, O'Reilly, 2008,

External links
 
  SQLAlchemy Tutorial

2006 software
Object-relational mapping
Python (programming language) libraries
Software using the MIT license